Neuried is a municipality in the district of Ortenau in Baden-Württemberg in Germany.

Ortsteile 
 Altenheim
 Dundenheim
 Ichenheim
 Müllen
 Schutterzell

References

Ortenaukreis